Kaloula indochinensis is a species of frogs in the family Microhylidae. It is found in Indochina, in southern Vietnam, eastern Cambodia, and southern to central Laos. Prior to its being described, it was confused with Kaloula baleata.

Description
Kaloula indochinensis are robust, medium-sized frogs. Tadpoles are not known. The dorsum in adults is chocolate to dark grayish-brown in colour and covered with fine white spots. There are orange-yellow patches on either side of the neck behind the eyes, and its skin is smooth but infused with low, rounded tubercles. The species resembles Kaloula baleata but differs from it by a number subtle characteristics: Kaloula indochinensis has larger finger discs, smaller inner metatarsal tubercles, only slightly raised inner and outer metatarsal tubercles, and 1–2 subarticular tubercles on fourth toe (vs. 3 in Kaloula baleata).

Range
Kaloula indochinensis has been recorded in (Chan, et al. 2013):
Krông Pa Village, K'Bang District, Gia Lai Province, Vietnam (type locality)
An Khê District, Gia Lai Province, Vietnam
Cát Tiên District, Lâm Đồng Province Vietnam
Nakai District, Khammouan Province, Laos
Ban Kiatngong, Champasak Province, Laos
Phnom Prich Wildlife Sanctuary, Mondulkiri Province, Cambodia

Habitat and behaviour
These frogs have mostly been found in small ephemeral ponds or beside temporary watercourses after heavy rains. Amplexus occurs in leaf litter. One specimen has been seen climbing bamboo at the transition of deciduous and lowland evergreen forest. They are active during night.

References

External links
Kaloula indochinensis

indochinensis
Amphibians of Cambodia
Amphibians of Laos
Amphibians of Vietnam
Amphibians described in 2013
Taxa named by Rafe M. Brown
Taxa named by Chan Kin Onn
Taxa named by Robert W. Murphy
Taxa named by Bryan Lynn Stuart